"Officially Missing You" is a song by Canadian R&B recording artist Tamia, taken from her third studio album, More (2004). Released as the album's lead single, it was written by Marcus Vest, better known by his stage name Seven Aurelius. The song is marked by its acoustic style featuring acoustic guitar and Tamia's vocals most prominently in the mix. "Officially Missing You" peaked at number one on the US Adult R&B Songs.

Background
"Officially Missing You" was written and produced by 7 Aurelius. A melancholic lament that is built around an acoustic guitar, it marked a departure for Aurelius who was primarily known for his hip hop productions up to then. In an interview with Billboard remarked that she was initially nervous about working with him, saying: "It was different than what I thought he was going to bring. But when we met in the studio, we instantly clicked. The song was very bare — just a guitar and a click track. That's the best way to record, because you can really put emotion in there."

Music video
The music video for "Officially Missing You" was filmed by American director Paul Hunter.

Track listings

Notes
 denotes additional producer

Credits and personnel 
Credits adapted from the liner notes of More.

Arrangement, production – 7 Aurelius
Bass – Al Carty
Guitar – Ricardo Ramos
Mixing, recording – Glen Marchese
Percussion – Bashiri Johnson
Strings arrangement – Larry Gold

Charts

Weekly charts

Year-end charts

References

2003 singles
Music videos directed by Paul Hunter (director)
Tamia songs
Songs written by Channel 7 (musician)
2003 songs
Elektra Records singles
Songs about heartache
Contemporary R&B ballads
Songs about loneliness
2000s ballads